Hill of Crosses is a site of pilgrimage about 12 km north of the city of Šiauliai, in northern Lithuania. The precise origin of the practice of leaving crosses on the hill is uncertain, but it is believed that the first crosses were placed on the former Jurgaičiai or Domantai hill fort after the 1831 Uprising. Over the generations, not only crosses and crucifixes, but statues of the Virgin Mary, carvings of Lithuanian patriots and thousands of tiny effigies and rosaries have been brought here by Catholic pilgrims. The exact number of crosses is unknown, but estimates put it at about 55,000 in 1990 and 100,000 in 2006. It is a major site of Catholic pilgrimage in Lithuania.

History
Over the generations, the place has come to signify the peaceful endurance of Lithuanian people despite the threats they faced throughout history. After the 3rd partition of the Polish–Lithuanian Commonwealth in 1795, Lithuania became part of the Russian Empire. Poles and Lithuanians unsuccessfully rebelled against Russian authorities in 1831 and 1863. These two uprisings are connected with the beginnings of the hill: as families could not locate bodies of perished rebels, they started putting up symbolic crosses at the site of a former hill fort.

When the old political structure of Eastern Europe fell apart in 1918, Lithuania once again declared its independence. Throughout this time, the Hill of Crosses was used as a place for Lithuanians to pray for peace, for their country, and for the loved ones they had lost during the Wars of Independence.

The site took on a special significance during the years 1944–1990, when Lithuania was occupied by the Soviet Union. Continuing to travel to the hill and leave their tributes, Lithuanians used it to demonstrate their allegiance to their original identity, religion and heritage. It was a venue of peaceful resistance, although the Soviets worked hard to remove new crosses, and bulldozed the site at least three times (including attempts in 1963 and 1973). There were even rumors that the authorities planned to build a dam on the nearby Kulvė River, a tributary to Mūša, so that the hill would end up underwater.

On September 7, 1993, Pope John Paul II visited the Hill of Crosses, declaring it a place for hope, peace, love and sacrifice. In 2000 a Franciscan hermitage was opened nearby. The interior decoration draws links with La Verna, the mountain where St. Francis is said to have received his stigmata. In May 2013, Šiauliai District Municipality adopted rules regarding the placement of crosses.

In December 2019, a tourist from China removed and tossed away a cross believed to be set up by the Hong Kong pro-democracy camp. She later condemned the protesters in a Twitter post and in an Instagram video saying, "We have done a good thing today. Our motherland is great." Lithuanian Foreign Minister Linas Linkevičius condemned the woman's action in a tweet that called it a "shameful, disgraceful act of vandalism" and said such behavior "can't and won't be tolerated".

See also 
Lithuanian cross crafting
Three Crosses – prominent monument in Vilnius, capital of Lithuania
Žemaičių Kalvarija – pilgrimage site in Samogitia, Lithuania
Khatchkars – Armenian monumental crosses.

References

External links 
 HillofCrosses.org

 KryziuKalnas.lt
 Hill of Crosses Lithuania
 Speech by John Paul II
 HillofCrosses.com

Catholic pilgrimage sites
Landmarks in Lithuania
Religious buildings and structures in Lithuania
Roman Catholic shrines in Lithuania
Votive offering
Buildings and structures in Šiauliai County
Tourist attractions in Šiauliai County